Stirling County may refer to:
 Stirling County RFC, Scottish rugby club
 Stirling County, Western Australia
 County of Stirling, i.e. Stirlingshire, Scotland

See also
 Sterling County, Texas